Wet Confetti is an American art rock band that formed in Portland, Oregon, United States, during November 2000. They are a three piece that consist of Alberta Poon on vocals, Bass VI and keytar; Daniel Grazzini on guitar and keyboards; and Michael McKinnon  on drums. The band's name is taken from the French novel To the End of the World by Blaise Cendrars.  The band blends rock, punk, pop, noise, rhythmic drumming and melodic breathless vocals together to make their own very distinctive sound. In January 2007 they introduced Richel Martinez as a live touring member. The band recently appeared in the third installment of the Burn to Shine series produced by Fugazi's Brendan Canty and directed by filmmaker Christoph Green. Their most recent album, "Laughing Gasping", was published by Pampelmoose, a label started by Gang of Four bass player Dave Allen.

Wet Confetti broke up in 2007, and the band members formed Reporter.

Discography
Another Fair, Another Show (2000)
Policia de la Educacion (2002)
This is so Illegal (Do It Fast) (2004)
Laughing Gasping (2007)
Wet Confetti has also had songs included on numerous compilations and two Consolidated Skateboard videos.

References

External links
 

Indie rock musical groups from Oregon
Musical groups from Portland, Oregon
Musical groups established in 2000
2000 establishments in Oregon
2007 disestablishments in Oregon
Musical groups disestablished in 2007